Felino is a comune in the Province of Parma, Italy.

Felino may also refer to:

 Felino (album), an album by Electrocutango
 El Felino (born 1964), Mexican professional wrestler or luchador
 Felino CB7, Canadian sports car
 Felino Corporation, a Canadian automobile manufacturer
 Felino Exercise, part of a series of joint military exercises

People
 Felino Dolloso (born 1980), Australian-Filipino actor
 Felino Jardim (born 1985), Dutch football player
 Felino Palafox (born 1950), Filipino architect
 Felino Maria Sandeo (born 1444-1503), Italian canonist

See also
 Felinae, a subfamily of the family Felidae